An upstream price is the price of one of the main inputs of production (for processing/manufacturing etc.) or a price quoted on higher market levels (e.g. wholesale markets). Upstream prices are the prices paid by producers (as opposed to consumers), and are directly related to the cost of production.

In contrast, downstream prices are the prices paid by consumers at the retail level. The relationship between upstream prices and downstream prices is largely explained by asymmetric price transmission.

References

Pricing